Ray Kirchmeyer was an American football and basketball player and coach. He played college football at Columbia University from 1923 to 1925 and was later the head football and basketball coach at Wagner College on Staten Island.

Early years
Kirchmeyer attended Technical High School in Buffalo, New York, where he played football and basketball.

Kirchmeyer played college football as a fullback for Columbia from 1923 to 1925. In a game rated as one of the greatest upsets in Columbia's football history, Kirchmeyer ran 60 yards for a touchdown against Army in 1925. He also starred for the Columbia basketball team that won the Eastern Intercollegiate Basketball League championship of 1925–26.

He also reportedly played professional football for Dan Blaine's Staten Island Stapletons in the National Football League.

Coaching career
In September 1928, Kirchmeyer was hired as the head football coach at Wagner College on Staten Island.

He served as the head football coach at Wagner College in Staten Island, New York from 1928 to 1932 and 1937 to 1946. Wagner did not field a team from 1942 to 1945 due to World War II. In 11 seasons as head football coach at Wagner, he compiled a 29–39–4 record.

Kirchmeyer also practice law on Staten Island.

Head coaching record

Football

References

Year of birth missing
Year of death missing
American football fullbacks
Centers (basketball)
Columbia Lions football players
Columbia Lions men's basketball players
Staten Island Stapletons players
Wagner Seahawks football coaches
Wagner Seahawks men's basketball coaches
Players of American football from Buffalo, New York
Basketball players from Buffalo, New York
Lawyers from New York City
Coaches of American football from New York (state)
Basketball coaches from New York (state)